Saint Placid's School and College  (SPSC) is a Catholic secondary school run by the Congregation of Holy Cross in Chittagong, Bangladesh. It was founded  by the Anglo Belgian Benedictines in 1853. As of 2022, it had a faculty of 68 to teach more than 3000 students.

History
The school was founded in 1853 as Bandel Catholic Free School by the Anglo Belgian Benedictines. Two years later it was transferred to the Congregation of Holy Cross. It was renamed St. Placid's School in 1883, after a Benedictine Saint of the 6th century.

Saint Placid's is one of many English medium schools that were started by Christian missionaries during the time of the British rule.  The schools were used to educate the Christian community of the regions they served to give them the advantages of education in the British ruled Indian subcontinent.  They were also used to promote the conversion of people to Christianity especially from the poor who saw the schools as an added benefit for their children.  Throughout their history though, these schools also took in students who were the children of the wealthy who could afford the fees that were charged to non-Christians.  These students may have formed the majority and also provided income to the schools.  After independence, the schools remained and adapted to the new countries they served (India, Pakistan and later Bangladesh as it became independent of Pakistan).  They catered more and more to the children of the emerging middle class and also had a secular public front that was aligned with the religious sensitivities of the local people.  At St. Placid's in the 1960s for example, the day started with the national anthem at assembly and when the students reached their "home room" they recited the Lord's Prayer, which was deemed consistent with both Muslim and Christian beliefs.

Throughout recent history, the success of such schools was due in part to what the educated classes saw as the failure of the public education system.  St. Placid's as well as similar schools filled the gap between what was seen by the educated and affluent members of society as the best education for obtaining the most desirable jobs in the government and business, and what the public education offered.

As of 2015, Principal Prodip Louis Rozario heads 68 teachers instructing 2,505 pupils.

Curriculum
St. Placid's School and College converted to Bengali medium shortly after the country became independent Bangladesh.

Extracurricular activities
St. Placid's scout troop was founded in 1923 and was three times national champion. St. Placid's basketball team was national champion in 2009. It became national champion again in 2015, 2020 and 2022.

Notable alumni
 Asif Iqbal - Bangladeshi lyricist, music composer and corporate personality 
Shantanu Biswas (25 October 1954 – 12 July 2019), dramatist, playwright, singer-songwriter
 Abdul Mannan, Chairman, University Grants Commission of Bangladesh (2015-2019)
 Aftab Ahmad, Vice-Chancellor, National University, Bangladesh (2003-2005)
 Saifuzzaman Chowdhury Javed, Member Parliament, Minister, Government of Bangladesh

References

Holy Cross secondary schools
Catholic secondary schools in Bangladesh
Educational institutions established in 1853
1853 establishments in India
Schools in Chittagong
Schools in Chittagong District